William Morehead of Herbertshire FRSE (1737–1793) was an 18th-century Scottish landowner and forefather of the Morehead dynasty of prominent persons in Scotland and India. In 1783 he was a joint founder of the Royal Society of Edinburgh.

Life
He was born in 1737 in Hamilton, Lanarkshire the son of Robert Morehead, a merchant.

He studied at Glasgow University.

He died on 18 June 1793 at "Herbertshire" a mansion south of Stirling and is buried in the family burial ground at Denny nearby.

Family
In 1768 he married Isabella Lockhart. Their children included Robert Morehead and his grandchildren included William Ambrose Morehead and Dr Charles Morehead, both eminent figures in India.

References

1737 births
1793 deaths
Alumni of the University of Glasgow
Scottish landowners
Fellows of the Royal Society of Edinburgh